Rock for People (RfP) is a large open-air summer rock festival in the Czech Republic. The festival began in 1995 in the town of Český Brod, and in 2007 it was moved to an unused airport in Hradec Králové. Headlining acts have included Muse, Thirty Seconds to Mars, Arctic Monkeys, My Chemical Romance, the Offspring, the Killers, Paramore, and Massive Attack.

History

Český Brod 

In 1995 the festival was held on 19 August, and attracted 1100 visitors to watch 18 bands.
In 1996 the festival was held on 29 June, and attracted 1600 visitors to watch 17 bands.
In 1997 the festival was held over two days for the first time, from 4–5 July, and consisted of 44 bands, with 2300 attendees.
In 1998 the festival expanded to three days, from 4–6 July, with 104 bands and 3800 visitors.
In 1999 the festival took place from 3–5 July, with 5000 visitors watching 90 bands, including Guano Apes, Tagada Jones, Terry Lee Hale, Calico Soul, and Tribal Drift.
In 2000 the festival took place from 4–6 July, with 7500 visitors watching 82 bands, including The Bloodhound Gang, In Extremo, Zion Train, and Burroughs Chris.
In 2001 the festival took place from 5–7 July, with 9000 visitors watching 92 bands, including Apocalyptica, Mike Patton & Fantomas, Asian Dub Foundation, Sri, Shelter, Ex Girl, Tanzwut, Tahiti 80, Defdaf, Terrorgruppe, Calico Soul, New Model Army, and Xaver Fischer Trio.
In 2002 the festival took place from 4–6 July, with 12,000 visitors watching 120 bands, including Chumbawamba, Transglobal Underground, Biohazard, Dead Kennedys, and Die Happy.
In 2003 the festival was held over four days for the first time, and the line-up included 130 bands, including Cypress Hill, The Levellers, Therapy?, Madball, Donots, Junkie XL, Modena City Ramblers, and 4Lyn.
In 2004 the festival took place from 3–5 July, with 15,000 visitors watching 170 bands, including Ska-P, Hooverphonic, Fun-Da-Mental, Värttinä, and Ill Nino.
In 2005 the festival took place from 3–6 July, and the line-up included 127 bands, including Garbage, Die Toten Hosen, and Leningrad Cowboys.
In 2006 the festival took place from 4–6 July, with 20,000 visitors watching 112 bands, including Manu Chao, Fun Lovin' Criminals, Radio Bemba Sound System, Agnostic Front, Madball, Mattafix, The Frames, Los De Abajo, Gocoo, Mad Sin, Deadline, and Mad Heads XL.

Hradec Králové

2007 
3–6 July (20,000 visitors, 127 bands)
Line Up: The Killers, The Hives, Sick of It All, Basement Jaxx, Flipsyde, Mory Kanté, Toy Dolls, The Levellers, Walls of Jericho, Front Line Assembly, Kissmet, Nomeansno, Die Happy, The Locos, The Bones, Disco Ensemble, Karamelo Santo, Deti Picasso, Extra Action Marching Band, Green Frog Feet, Zeroscape and others.

2008 
2–5 July (25,000 visitors, 150 bands)
Line Up: The Offspring, Kaiser Chiefs, Massive Attack, Helmet, Enter Shikari, Flogging Molly, The Locos, Madball, Dreadzone, H2O, N.O.H.A., Los De Abajo, Black Mountain, Kissmet, iO, Watcha Clan, Panteón Rococó, Donots, Holy Fuck, VNV Nation, La Kinky Beat, Demented Are Go, Zulu 9:30, Outvile, Empyr, Invases, Seth Lakeman, Park Avenue, Montreal, Hopes Die Last, Karras, Tremore, Nomad Soundsystem, Dj Scratchy and others.

2009 
3–6 July (27,000 visitors, 130 bands)
Line Up: Arctic Monkeys, Placebo, Ska-P, Bloc Party, Underworld, Gogol Bordello, Static-X, Therapy?, Freestylers, Hadouken!, The Kooks, Mucky Pup, Ignite, Comeback Kid, The Bouncing Souls, Fancy, Derfine, Firewater, 7 Weeks, Expatriate, Gocoo, Keziah Jones, Defeater (band), Black President, Scratch Bandits Crew, Ra:IN and others.

2010 
3–6 July (28,500 visitors, 170 bands)
Line Up: Muse, The Prodigy, NOFX, Editors, Billy Talent, Morcheeba, Skunk Anansie, The Subways, Tricky, Alexisonfire, Suicidal Tendencies, Juliette Lewis, Archive, Gallows, Skindred, Coheed and Cambria, Death by Stereo, Does It Offend You, Yeah?, Evergreen Terrace, Jello Biafra And The Guantanamo School Of Medicine, Disco Ensemble, Wisdom in Chains, Dreadzone, Horse the Band, The Inspector Cluzo, Doping Panda, The Mahones and others.

2011 
2–5 July (28,000 visitors, 146 bands)
Line Up: Paramore, Pendulum, My Chemical Romance, Bullet for My Valentine, The Streets, Sum 41, Parkway Drive, Beatsteaks, White Lies, Digitalism, Primus, Anberlin, Jimmy Eat World, The Wombats, John Butler Trio, The Qemists, Kele, Tokyo Ska Paradise Orchestra, Protest The Hero, Bright Eyes, US Bombs, The Levellers, Deez Nuts, Molotov, Title Fight, Cancer Bats, Destine, Radio Dead Ones, Jenny and Johnny, Your Demise and others.

2012 
3–6 July (30,700 visitors, 277 bands)
Line Up: Faith No More, Franz Ferdinand, Skrillex, The Prodigy, Refused, Orbital, Example, Enter Shikari, Architects, Crystal Castles, Flogging Molly, The Subways, Two Door Cinema Club, August Burns Red, I Killed The Prom Queen, The Kooks, H2O, Selah Sue, The Asteroids Galaxy Tour, The Computers, The Octopussys, Molotov Jukebox, Anna Calvi, Scarred By Beauty, 3 Feet Smaller, The Inspector Cluzo, The Feud, Keko Yoma, Irie Révoltés, Grimus and others.

2013 
2–5 July (30,000 visitors, 200 bands)
Line up: Thirty Seconds to Mars, Queens of the Stone Age, Foals, Parov Stelar Band, Billy Talent, Bloc Party, Gogol Bordello, Charlie Straight, Klaxons, Kryštof, Modestep, Papa Roach, Pražský výběr, The Gaslight Anthem, Xindl X, A Day to Remember, The Devil Wears Prada, Aneta Langerová, Borgore, Filharmonie Hradec Králové, Pipes and Pints, Royal Republic, Heart in Hand, Boris Carloff, Ohm Square, Dubioza kolektiv, Friska Viljor, Goodfellas, Hacktivist, Jan Budař  Eliščin Band, Skyline, Sto zvířat, Sunshine, UDG, Deathgaze, Karel Gott and others

2014 
3–5 July
Line Up: Manu Chao, Biffy Clyro, Lucie, Madness, Chase & Status, The Naked and Famous, Netsky, Tom Odell, Asian Dub Foundation, Steven Seagal, The Afghan Whigs, We Came As Romans, Deap Vally, Emmure, Holy Esque, Kadebostany, Molotov Jukebox, N.O.H.A., School Is Cool, The Feud, The Strypes, Thepetebox, 7 Weeks, Comact Disk Dummies, Groovy Shiva, Madame Pepper, Tricot, Paceshifters and others.

2015 
4–6 June
Line Up: Three Days Grace, Hollywood Undead, Asking Alexandria, Faith No More, Yellowcard, Limp Bizkit, Bastille, We Are Harlot, Red Fang, Vypsaná fixa, David Koller and others.

External links 
 
 Official last.fm event
 Official YouTube channel

Rock festivals in the Czech Republic
Summer festivals
Hradec Králové
Music festivals established in 1995
Summer events in the Czech Republic